Unione Sindacale Italiana (USI; Italian Syndicalist Union or Italian Workers' Union) is an anarcho-syndicalist trade union. It is the Italian section of the International Workers' Association (IWA; Associazione Internazionale dei Lavoratori in Italian or AIT - ''Asociación Internacional de los Trabajadores in the common Spanish reference), and the name of USI is also abbreviated as USI-AIT.

Early history
The USI was founded in 1912, after a group of workers, previously affiliated with the Confederazione Generale del Lavoro (CGL), met in Modena and declared themselves linked to the legacy of the First International, and later joined the anarcho-syndicalist International Workers' Association.

The most left-wing camere del lavoro adhered in rapid succession to the USI, and it engaged in all major political battles for labor rights - without ever adopting the militarist attitudes present with other trade unions. Nonetheless, after the outbreak of World War I, USI was shaken by the dispute around the issue of Italy's intervention in the conflict on the Entente Powers' side. The problem was made acute by the presence of eminent pro-intervention, national-syndicalist voices inside the body: Alceste De Ambris, Filippo Corridoni, and, initially, Giuseppe Di Vittorio. The union managed to maintain its opposition to militarism, under the leadership of Armando Borghi and Alberto Meschi.

The Fascist regime and afterwards
When the war ended, USI peaked in numbers (it was during this time that it joined the IWA, becoming known as the USI-AIT). It became a major opponent of Benito Mussolini and the Fascist regime, fighting street battles with the Blackshirts - culminating in the August 1922 riots of Parma, when the USI-AIT faced Italo Balbo and his Arditi.

USI-AIT was outlawed by Mussolini in 1926, but resumed its activities in clandestinity and exile. It fought against Francisco Franco in the Spanish Civil War, alongside the Confederación Nacional del Trabajo and Federación Anarquista Ibérica, and took part in the Spanish Revolution. After World War II and the proclamation of the Republic, former members of the union followed the guidelines of the Federazione Anarchica Italiana that called for the creation of a unitary movement, and joined the Confederazione Generale Italiana del Lavoro (CGIL).

When CGIL split in 1950, several activists refounded USI-AIT - nonetheless, the group was marginal, and present only in some of Italy's regions until the 1960s. It is connected with Autonomism, and has kept its syndicalist message.

Split in USI 
In the second half of the 1990s, a split occurred in USI. 20th IWA (AIT) Congress in Madrid in December 1996 decided to accept the USI "Prato Carnico" and not the "USI Rome" as the IWA Section in Italy. Despite this, the non-recognized USI group continued to use the initials "AIT" on their webpages and on many written announcements. The IWA has asked repeatedly for them to stop this activity, as they are not part of the IWA.

See also
Autonomism
Biennio rosso
Anarchism in Italy

References 

1912 establishments in Italy
Anarchist organisations in Italy
Anarcho-syndicalism
Far-left politics in Italy
International Workers' Association
National trade union centers of Italy
Organisations of the Spanish Civil War
Syndicalism
Trade unions established in 1912
Syndicalist trade unions